L. vulgaris may refer to:
 Linaria vulgaris, a toadflax species
 Lysimachia vulgaris, a herbaceous perennial plant species

See also
 Vulgaris (disambiguation)